Ready Steady Go may refer to:

Television
 Ready Steady Go!, a 1963–1966 British music TV programme 
 Ready Steady Go (Pakistani TV series), a 2017–2020 sitcom

Music
 Ready, Steady, Go! (album), by Drake Bell, 2014
 "Ready Steady Go" (L'Arc-en-Ciel song), 2004
 "Ready Steady Go", a song by Nami Tamaki from the 2006 album Speciality
 "Ready Steady Go", a 1978 song by Generation X, from the 1978 album Generation X
 "Southern Sun"/"Ready Steady Go", by Oakenfold, 2002

See also 

 "Ready Steady Goa", a song by Half Man Half Biscuit from the 1998 album Four Lads Who Shook the Wirral